(born 19 March 1977 in Ōno, Gifu) is a Japanese actor. He has starred several TV series such as Atsuhime (2008) and Nobuta. O Produce (2005) as well as movies such as Densha otoko (2005). He is a high school graduate and does not have a college degree. He won the award for best supporting actor at the 31st Yokohama Film Festival for Nonchan Noriben.

Filmography

Film
 Like Grains of Sand (1996)
 Kisarazu Cat's Eye: Nihon Series (2003) as Ucchi
 Kamikaze Girls (2004)
 Densha Otoko (2005)
 Kisarazu Cat's Eye: World Series (2006) as Ucchi
 Fine, Totally Fine (2008) 
 Nonchan Noriben (2009)
 I Am a Hero (2016) as Sango
 The Confidence Man JP: The Movie (2019)
 Three Nobunagas (2019) as Oda Nobunaga?
 Thank you, My Highlight vol.04 (2019)
 Your Eyes Tell (2020)
 Daughter of Lupin: The Movie (2021)
 The Three Young-Men in Midnight: The Movie (2022) as Mattsun

Television
 Iguana Girl (1996)
 Kisarazu Cat's Eye (2002) as Ucchi
 Nobuta. O Produce (2005) as Takeshi Yokoyama
 Sexy Voice and Robo (2007) as Hideyoshi Nanashi
 Hanazakari no Kimitachi e (2007) as Ashiya Shizuki, Ashiya Mizuki's brother
 Hanazakari no Kimitachi e (Special, 2008) as Ashiya Shizuki, Ashiya Mizuki's brother
 Atsuhime (2008) as Shimazu Tadayuki, Atsuhime's brother
 The Quiz Show (2008)
 1 Pound no Fukuin (2008) as Ueda
 Atashinchi no Danshi (2009) as Ohkura Takeru, Ohkura Shinjo's 2nd son
 Todome no Kiss (2018) as Koichi Nezu
 Young GTO (2020) as Enatsu

References

External links

1977 births
Living people
Male actors from Gifu Prefecture